The Maoist insurgency in Bangladesh was an ongoing conflict between the government of Bangladesh and the PBCP and the PBCP-J.

History

The Purbo Banglar Communist Party was founded in 1968. During the Bangladesh Liberation War the group aligned itself with Pakistan and China against Bangladeshi nationalists and the Soviet Union. 

But only in the 1990s did he begin to be active in criminal activities (such as extortion, murder, kidnapping, to finance his armed struggle).  During the  In 1993 the group started a war against the BCP for the control of the territory and for ideological differences (the BCP is only Maoist, instead the PBCP has become over the years a mixture of Maoism and Naxalitism). In the 2000s the group underwent several splits, the most important, which took place in 2003, formed the PBCP-J group (Purga Banglar Communist Party-Janajuddha, that wants a socialist revolution) thus starting an internal conflict that will cause 18 victims. In 2002, Gazi Kamrul, founder of BCP was detained from his residence, known as White House, by joint forces during Operation Clean Heart on 23 August 2002. Since 2005 the PBCP began to extend its insurrection with terrorist attacks, clashes with the government and with rival groups and some Islamist groups. 
In 2006 the PBCP-J also began to carry out attacks and to clash with the government. Between 2005 and 2006, 379 peoples died in the insurgency. After this period, the insurrection diminished in intensity from year to year with few incidents and clashes.

Casualties

From 1993 to 2022 there were 1,191+ deaths in the insurgency. From the period 2003-2006 (the most violent period of the insurgency) there were 724 deaths.

See also
Terrorism in Bangladesh
Crime in Bangladesh

References

 
1990s in Bangladesh
2000s in Bangladesh
2010s in Bangladesh
Communist rebellions